The Volkswagen Lupo (Typ 6X) is a city car that was produced by the German car manufacturer Volkswagen, from 1998 to 2005. It shares most of its aspects with the Volkswagen Group's SEAT Arosa, both derived from the Volkswagen Polo Mk3 platform. Main differences are found in styling and equipment. The Lupo name is Latin, meaning wolf, and is named after its home town of Wolfsburg.

Model history

The Lupo was introduced in October 1998, to fill a gap at the bottom of the Volkswagen model range caused by the increasing size and weight of the Polo. It was a badge engineered version of the stablemate, the 1997 SEAT Arosa. The right-hand-drive version for the UK market was launched in the spring of 1999. In Japan, it was launched in July 2001.

Both Lupo and Arosa use the A00 platform which is a shortened version of the Polo/Ibiza A0 platform. Initially only available in two trim variants, the budget E trim and the upgraded S trim; the range later expanded to include a Sport and GTI variant.

Petrol engines ranged from 1.0 to 1.4 (1.6 for the GTI) with diesels from 1.2 to 1.7. The differences between the E and S trim included painted door mirrors, door handles and strip, central locking, electric windows, double folding seats and opening rear windows.

Just as the Arosa, the Lupo was designed by Jozef Kabaň.

Replacement
Sales of the Lupo were slow and missed Volkswagen's targets, partly because of its high price in the class and it was higher than its sister car SEAT Arosa. In 2001 a Volkswagen source claimed that it was decided the Lupo would eventually be discontinued and replaced by a model built in China.

Production of the Lupo was discontinued in June 2005, and was replaced on the European market by the Brazilian designed Fox. Due to the decision taken by Volkswagen, to use the Fox instead of developing any genuine replacement for the Lupo, resulted in SEAT being unable to produce their own version, resulting in the end of production of the Arosa in June 2004. The Lupo's spiritual successor, Volkswagen up!, was released in 2011.

Specifications
Length: 
Width:  (with mirrors)
Height: 
Luggage capacity (rear seats up): 130 litres, (rear seats down) 833 litres
Weight:

Engines

Versions

Lupo 3L

The Volkswagen Lupo 3L (Typ 6E) was a special edition made with the intent of being the world's first car in series production consuming as little as 3 litres of fuel per 100 kilometres (79 miles per US gallon or 94 miles per Imperial gallon). To achieve this, the 3L was significantly changed from the standard Lupo to include:

 1.2 litre three cylinder diesel engine with turbocharger and direct injection 
 Use of light weight aluminum and magnesium alloys for doors, bonnet (hood), rear hatch, seat frames, engine block, wheels, suspension system etc. to achieve a weight of only 
 Tiptronic gearbox
 Engine start/stop automatic to avoid long idling periods
 Low rolling resistance tires
 Automated manual transmission and clutch, to optimise fuel consumption, with a Tiptronic mode for the gearbox
 Changed aerodynamics, so a  value of 0.29 was achieved

The 3L, along with the GTI and FSI, had a completely different steel body to other Lupos, using thinner but stronger steel sheet. The car had an automated manual transmission with a Tiptronic mode on the selector and electro-hydraulic actuation system for the clutch and shifting. The car also had an ECO mode. When engaged it limited the power to 41 bhp (31 kW; 42 PS) (excluding kick down) and programmed the transmission to change up at the most economical point.

ECO mode also activated the start/stop function, a feature that was new to European cars at the time.

To restart, the driver simply takes his foot off the brake and presses the accelerator. In ECO mode, the clutch was disengaged when the accelerator pedal was released for maximum economy, so the car freewheels as much as possible, with the clutch re engaging as soon as the accelerator pedal or brake pedal is touched. The 3L also has only four-wheel bolts and alloy brake drums at the rear, along with many aluminium suspension components.

Initially, there were very few options on the 3L, as options added weight which affected fuel consumption. Those available initially were electrically heated and electrically controlled mirrors, fog lights, and different paint colours. In order to increase sales, other options were offered, including all electric steering, electric windows, and air conditioning.

These options, however, increased fuel consumption slightly. In July 2001, a Japanese economy driver, Dr. Miyano, used it to set a new world record for the most frugal circumnavigation of Britain in a standard diesel production car, with an average fuel economy figure of 119.48 mpg or 2.36 L/100 km.

In November 2003, Gerhard Plattner covered a distance of 2,910 miles through twenty European countries in a standard Lupo 3L TDI. He achieved his aim of completing this journey, which started in Oslo, Norway, and finished in The Hague in the Netherlands, with just €100 worth of fuel. In fact, all he required was 90.94 euros, which corresponds to an average consumption of 2.78 litres per 100 km (101.6 mpg).

The Lupo 3L shared its engine and special gearbox with the Audi A2 1.2 TDI 3L. As a result of this and other changes, this Audi A2 is also capable of reaching the same results as the Lupo 3L. According to the instruction manual of the Lupo 3L, the 3L engine also runs on Rapeseed Methyl Ester (RME) without any changes to the engine.

During the period of series production of the Lupo 3L, Volkswagen also presented the 1L Concept, a prototype made with the objective of proving the capability of producing a roadworthy vehicle consuming only 1 litre of fuel per 100 kilometres (235 miles per US gallon).

Lupo FSi
The Lupo FSi was the first direct injection petrol powered production vehicle Volkswagen produced. A 5L/100 km 1.4 16v petrol version of the Lupo 3L with an average consumption of 4.9L/100 km. This direct injection engine next to a conventional engine with similar power uses around 30% less fuel. It had a similar automated gearbox to the 3L but with different gear ratios.

Outwardly, it was almost identical to a 3L but with a different front grill, slightly wider wheels with a different design and lacked the magnesium steering wheel and rear bumper of the 3L. Early 3L and FSi models had aluminium tailgates which were lighter and more aerodynamic than their standard Lupo counterparts. Early FSi models also had a unique spoiler while later ones without the aluminium tailgates were fitted with the same spoiler as the Lupo GTI. The FSi was only sold in Germany, Austria and Switzerland.

Lupo GTI

The 1.6 L Lupo GTI, introduced for the model year of 2000, has been labelled a true successor to the Volkswagen Golf Mk1, one of the first true hot hatches. The GTI can be identified by its fully body coloured bumpers and twin central exhausts. In March 2002, a six speed gearbox was added, together with improved throttle response, and was suggested as a competitor to the Mini Cooper, or the larger Volkswagen Polo GTI.

The GTI features much more standard equipment which was not available on any other in the Lupo range, including bi-xenon headlights, 15 inch Bathurst alloy wheels and an off black interior.

Production figures
More than 480,000 Volkswagen Lupo cars have been sold and produced through its lifetime.

The total production per year of VW Lupo cars is shown below:

Awards
Best Micromini 1999 (Ireland)

Literature

Notes

References

External links

 World Record Economy drive

Lupo
Front-wheel-drive vehicles
City cars
Euro NCAP superminis
2000s cars
Cars introduced in 1998